The Preussenstadion is a football stadium in the Berlin district of Lankwitz (Steglitz-Zehlendorf). The football club BFC Preussen play their home games in the stadium, which has a capacity of 3,000 spectators, including 200 seats.

At the opening on 23 October 1938, the capacity was for 20,000 spectators, but the stadium was destroyed in the Second World War and was rebuilt gradually. From the originally built stadium, the concrete steps are preserved as the "oldest standing traverses of Berlin".

The stadium is located at Malteserstraße 24-36, at the corner of Kamenzer Damm, opposite the Lankwitz municipal park.

References 
 Christian Wolter: Rasen der Leidenschaften. Die Fussballplätze von Berlin. Edition Else, Berlin 2011, S. 216–217.

External links 
 Preussenstadion on the website of the football division of Berliner Fussball Club Preußen 1894
 Preussenstadion on stadionsuche.de

Single Signature 

Steglitz-Zehlendorf